The 1972–73 Albanian National Championship was the 34th season of the Albanian National Championship, the top professional league for association football clubs, since its establishment in 1930.

Overview
It was contested by 14 teams, and Dinamo Tirana won the championship.

League table

Note: 'Traktori' is Lushnja, 'Labinoti' is Elbasani, '17 Nëntori' is Tirana, 'Lokomotiva Durrës' is Teuta

Results

References
Albania - List of final tables (RSSSF)

Kategoria Superiore seasons
1
Albania